Nothocestrum latifolium, commonly known as broadleaf aiea, is a species of flowering plant in the nightshade family, Solanaceae, that is endemic to Hawaii. Broadleaf aiea is threatened by habitat loss. The CDP of Aiea on Oahu was named after this species.

Uses
Native Hawaiians used the soft, greenish wood of aiea to make pale (gunwales) for waa (outrigger canoes) and aho (thatching sticks).The reddish yellow berries were sometimes eaten, while the bark and leaves were used for (unspecified) medicinal purposes.

References

External links

Physaleae
Endemic flora of Hawaii
Trees of Hawaii
Biota of Kauai
Biota of Lanai
Biota of Maui
Biota of Molokai
Biota of Oahu
Taxonomy articles created by Polbot